The Royal Navy Football Association, also simply known as the Royal Navy FA, is the governing body of football for the Royal Navy.

See also
Royal Marines Football Association

References

External links
 Meet the Team (Royal Navy FA's official site)

County football associations
Football
Military association football
Military sports governing bodies  in the United Kingdom
Sports organizations established in 1904
1904 establishments in the United Kingdom